William Franklin Lyell (February 14, 1929 – August 31, 1951) was a soldier in the United States Army during the Korean War. He posthumously received the Medal of Honor for his actions on August 31, 1951.

Lyell joined the Army from Old Hickory, Tennessee in 1950.

Medal of Honor citation
Rank and organization: Corporal, U.S. Army, Company F, 17th Infantry Regiment, 7th Infantry Division

Place and date: Near Chup'a-ri, Korea, August 31, 1951

Entered service at: Old Hickory, Tennessee Birth: Hickman County, Tennessee

G.O. No.: 4, January 9, 1953.

Citation:

Cpl. Lyell, a member of Company F, distinguished himself by conspicuous gallantry and outstanding courage above and beyond the call of duty in action against the enemy. When his platoon leader was killed, Cpl. Lyell assumed command and led his unit in an assault on strongly fortified enemy positions located on commanding terrain. When his platoon came under vicious, raking fire which halted the forward movement, Cpl. Lyell seized a 57mm. recoilless rifle and unhesitatingly moved ahead to a suitable firing position from which he delivered deadly accurate fire completely destroying an enemy bunker, killing its occupants. He then returned to his platoon and was resuming the assault when the unit was again subjected to intense hostile fire from 2 other bunkers. Disregarding his personal safety, armed with grenades he charged forward hurling grenades into 1 of the enemy emplacements, and although painfully wounded in this action he pressed on destroying the bunker and killing 6 of the foe. He then continued his attack against a third enemy position, throwing grenades as he ran forward, annihilating 4 enemy soldiers. He then led his platoon to the north slope of the hill where positions were occupied from which effective fire was delivered against the enemy in support of friendly troops moving up. Fearlessly exposing himself to enemy fire, he continuously moved about directing and encouraging his men until he was mortally wounded by enemy mortar fire. Cpl. Lyell's extraordinary heroism, indomitable courage, and aggressive leadership reflect great credit on himself and are in keeping with the highest traditions of the military service.

See also

List of Medal of Honor recipients
List of Korean War Medal of Honor recipients

Notes

References

External links

1929 births
1951 deaths
People from Hickman County, Tennessee
United States Army Medal of Honor recipients
American military personnel killed in the Korean War
Korean War recipients of the Medal of Honor
People from Old Hickory, Tennessee
United States Army soldiers
United States Army personnel of the Korean War